Widad Hamdi was an Egyptian actress. She starred in over 600 films during her lifetime, and almost all her roles were as a servant or maid.

Early life and career
Widad Mohammed Issawi Zaraarah was born on March 7, 1924, in Kafr El-Sheikh, Egypt. She studied at the Institute of Representation and graduated after two years. Hamdi started her career as a singer. Her first film was Henry Barakat's This Was My Father's Crime (1945).
She worked with the Egyptian National Troupe on several plays. Hamdi retired in the sixties but was called out of retirement to work on the play Tamr Henna.

Hamdi was married 3 times, to composer Muhammad al-Mougy and actors Salaah Kabeel and Muhammad al-Toukhy.

Death
Hamdi was killed in 1994. She was stabbed 35 times in the neck, chest, and abdomen. Her killer was convicted and later, executed. She died with very little money to her name.

Selected filmography

Film
This Was My Father's Crime (1945)
Bread and Salt (1949)
The Love Office (1950)
A Million Pounds (1954)
Miss Hanafi (1954)
Fatawat el Husseinia (1955)
The Female Boss (1959)
Forbidden Women (1959)
Hassan and Nayima (1959)
Love and Adoration (1960)
A Storm of Love (1961)
Wife Number 13 (1962)
Soft Hands (1963)
Min Fadlik Wa Ihsanik (1986)

Television
 The Return of the Spirit (1977)

Plays
Azeeza and Younis (Azeeza W Younis)
20 Hens and a Rooster (20 farkha we deek)
A Game Called Love (L’eba esmaha al-hobb)
Mother of Rateeba (Om-Rateeba)

See also
Cinema of Egypt
Lists of Egyptian films

Notes

References

External links 

Egyptian film actresses
1924 births
1994 deaths
Egyptian actresses
Egyptian murder victims
Deaths by stabbing in Egypt
People from Kafr El Sheikh Governorate